Lance corporal Semesa Rokoduguni (born 28 August 1987) is a professional rugby union player for US Montauban in France's Pro D2, previously playing for English club Bath, and soldier in the British Army, having served in Afghanistan.

Born in Fiji he qualified for England on residency while serving in the Army.

Club career

Lytchett Minster RFC
Roko joined LMRFC in Feb 2008 while training with the army at Semesa camp.

Roko played for just over a season playing in the centre where he scored many tries and helped the club gain promotion to Hampshire 1

Army RU
Rokoduguni has represented the Army Rugby Union XV, and German Rugby-Bundesliga team DRC Hannover. He represented the army twice in the 2011-2012 season, scoring four tries against the RAF and three against the Navy.

He has also represented the Army Sevens team in the Middlesex Sevens and the International Defence Sevens, the latter of which was won by the Army.

Bath Rugby
In October 2012, it was announced that Rokoduguni had been signed on a senior contract with Bath after impressing for their second side, Bath United.

Rokoduguni made his debut for the Bath senior team on 10 November 2012, in their LV= Cup match against Newport Gwent Dragons. He scored a try after just 9 minutes, and finished the game with two tries.

Montauban
On 17 June 2022, after 10 years at Bath, Rokoduguni would leave The Rec to join French side Montauban in the Pro D2 competition from the 2022-23 season.

International career
In January 2014, he was included in a 25-member England Saxons squad to prepare for the upcoming match against the Irish Wolfhounds.

On 8 November 2014, Rokoduguni made his Test debut for England, losing to New Zealand 21-24 as part of the 2014 Autumn Internationals. He was the first serving British soldier to play for England since Tim Rodber in 1999.
In 2015 Rokoduguni was called up into the England Rugby World Cup Squad, after David Strettle completed his move to French-based side Clermont.

International tries

Personal life
Rokoduguni is a sniper of the Royal Scots Dragoon Guards in the British Army. He joined the Army in 2007 and was deployed to Afghanistan as part of Operation Herrick in 2011 where he was attached to 4th Battalion, The Royal Regiment of Scotland (4SCOTS).

His great-great-grandfather, great-grandfather and father all served in the military. 

Semesa's brother, Rupeni Rokoduguni, is also in the British Army serving in Black Watch near Inverness. He also has a similar passion for rugby and currently plays for Highland Rugby Club.

References

1987 births
Bath Rugby players
DRC Hannover players
Living people
Expatriate rugby union players in Germany
Expatriate rugby union players in England
Fijian expatriate rugby union players
Fijian expatriate sportspeople in Germany
Fijian expatriate sportspeople in England
Fijian rugby union players
Royal Scots Dragoon Guards soldiers
England international rugby union players
People from Nausori
I-Taukei Fijian people
Rugby union centres